A callable object, in computer programming, is any object that can be called like a function.

In different languages

In C++ 
 pointer to function;
 pointer to member function;
 functor;
 lambda expression.
 std::function is a template class that can hold any callable object that matches its signature.

In C++, any class that overloads the function call operator operator() may be called using function-call syntax.
#include <iostream>
struct Foo
{
    void operator()() const
    {
        std::cout << "Called.";
    }
};

int main()
{
   Foo foo_instance;
   foo_instance();  // This will output "Called." to the screen.
}

In C# 
 delegate;
 lambda expression.

In PHP 

PHP 5.3+ has first-class functions that can be used e.g. as parameter to the usort() function:

$a = array(3, 1, 4);
usort($a, function ($x, $y) { return $x - $y; });

It is also possible in PHP 5.3+ to make objects invokable by adding a magic __invoke() method to their class:

class Minus
{
    public function __invoke($x, $y) { return $x - $y; }
}

$a = array(3, 1, 4);
usort($a, new Minus());

In Python 
In Python any object with a __call__() method can be called using function-call syntax.

class Foo:
    def __call__(self):
        print("Called.")

foo_instance = Foo()
foo_instance()  # This will output "Called." to the screen.

Another example:
class Accumulator:
    def __init__(self, n):
        self.n = n

    def __call__(self, x):
        self.n += x
        return self.n

In Dart 
To allow your Dart class to be called like a function, implement the call() method.class WannabeFunction {
  call(String a, String b, String c) => '$a $b $c!';
}

main() {
  var wf = new WannabeFunction();
  var out = wf("Hi","there,","gang");
  print('$out');
}

In Swift 
In Swift, callable objects are defined using callAsFunction.
struct CallableStruct {
    var value: Int
    func callAsFunction(_ number: Int, scale: Int) {
        print(scale * (number + value))
    }
}
let callable = CallableStruct(value: 100)
callable(4, scale: 2)
callable.callAsFunction(4, scale: 2)
// Both function calls print 208.

References

External links 
 C++ Callable concept

Articles with example C++ code
Articles with example PHP code
Articles with example Python (programming language) code
Object (computer science)
Subroutines